Elrathia is a genus of trilobite belonging to Ptychopariacea known from the mid-Cambrian of Laurentia (North America). E. kingii is one of the most common trilobite fossils in the USA locally found in extremely high concentrations within the Wheeler Formation in the U.S. state of Utah.
E. kingii has been considered the most recognizable trilobite. Commercial quarries extract E. kingii in prolific numbers, with just one commercial collector estimating 1.5 million specimens extracted in a 20-year career. 1950 specimens of Elrathia are known from the Greater Phyllopod bed, where they comprise 3.7% of the community.

Etymology 
Even though the generic name Elrathia was first published in the combination E. kingii, a species from the House Range, Utah, the name, itself, is derived from Elrath, Cherokee County, Alabama.

Description 
E. kingii is a medium-sized trilobite with a smooth sub-ovate carapace that is tapered towards the rear. Thorax is usually 13 segments. Pygidium has four axial rings and a long terminal piece. Posterior margin of the pygidium has a long broad medial notch.

In contrast, E. marjum usually has 12 segments, 5 axial rings, lacks a notched posterior margin and possess incipient antero-lateral spines.

The British Columbian species, E. permulta, is much smaller, averaging about only 20 millimeters, and has up to thoracic 14 segments. Because E. permulta lacks several diagnostic features of the genus it may even represent a distinct genus.

See also

Hypoxia (environmental)

References

External links 
 
 
 "Order ptychopariida". A Guide to the Orders of Trilobites. Sam Gon III. 2009

Burgess Shale fossils
Alokistocaridae
Cambrian trilobites
Fossils of British Columbia
Fossils of the United States
Fossils of Georgia (U.S. state)
Cambrian genus extinctions
Wheeler Shale
Paleozoic life of Newfoundland and Labrador